"America" is a song by Canadian rock musician Kim Mitchell. It was released May 1992 as the second single from his fourth studio album, Aural Fixations. It was Mitchell's highest-charting single in Canada, reaching number 3 on the RPM Top Singles chart.

Charts

Weekly charts

References

1992 songs
1992 singles
Kim Mitchell songs